Grigorovich was a Soviet aircraft design bureau, headed by Dmitry Pavlovich Grigorovich.

Aircraft

Reconnaissance
 M-1 - experimental observation flying boat, 1913
 M-2 - biplane flying boat, 1914
 M-3 - biplane flying boat, developed from the M-2, 1914
 M-4 - biplane flying boat, developed from the M-3
 M-5 - reconnaissance biplane flying boat, 1914
 M-6 - biplane flying boat
 M-7 - biplane flying boat
 M-8 - biplane flying boat
 M-9 - biplane reconnaissance flying boat with machine gun, 1915, with cannon, 1916
 M-10 - flying boat, 1915
 MK-1 - three-engine biplane reconnaissance-bomber seaplane, 1916
 M-15 - biplane reconnaissance flying boat; scaled-down M-9, 1916
 M-16 - biplane reconnaissance flying boat for winter conditions; developed from the M-9, 1916
 M-17 - flying boat; re-engined M-15
 M-18 - flying boat; re-engined M-15, never finished
 M-19 - flying boat; scaled-down M-9, never finished; 1918
 M-20 - flying boat; refined M-5, 1916
 M-22 - reconnaissance flying boat (project) - 1922
 M-23bis - biplane flying boat developed from the M-9, 1923
 M-24 - biplane reconnaissance flying boat, 1923
 MRL-1 - long-range reconnaissance flying boat, 1925
 MR-2 - long-range reconnaissance flying boat, 1926
 MR-5 - long-range reconnaissance flying boat, 1929
 ROM-1 - long-range reconnaissance flying boat, 1927
 ROM-2/MR-3/MDR-1 - long-range reconnaissance flying boat, 1929

Fighter
 M-11 - biplane flying boat-fighter, 1916
 M-12 - improved M-11, 1916
 M-13 - naval fighter project, 1916
 M-14 - naval fighter project, 1916
 PI-1 (Pushechny Istrebitel, the first one) - fighter with cannons and retractable gear, 1930..1933, developed from the I-Z
 I-1 - fighter, 1924; first land-based design
 I-2 - fighter developed from the I-1, 1924; first Soviet fighter to enter service in large numbers
 I-Z - single-seat fighter, 1931
 I-9 - twin-engine single-seat heavy fighter project, 1932
 I-10 - single-seat high-speed fighter project, 1933
 IP-1 (DG-52) - cannon fighter, 1934
 IP-2 (DG-54) - re-engined IP-1, never finished
 IP-4 (DG-53) - downsized version of IP-1, 1934

Escort fighter
 LK-3 (DG-56) - twin-engine escort fighter project, 1936

Torpedo bomber
 GASN (Gydro-Aeroplane Spetsialnogo Naznacheniya, "special purpose hydroplane") - biplane torpedo bomber, 1917; world's first torpedo-bomber aircraft

Bomber
 TB-5 - heavy bomber prototype, 1931
 DG-57 - medium bomber project, 1936

Dive bomber
 PB-1 (DG-58) - monoplane dive bomber project, 1935

Trainer
 MUR-1 - flying boat trainer developed from the M-5/M-20, 1926
 MU-2 - flying boat trainer, 1928
 MUR-2 - flying boat laboratory for aerodynamic testing

Ground attack
 TSh-1 - ground attack biplane, 1931
 TSh-2 - ground attack biplane, 1931

Minelayer
 MM-1 - minelaying twin-engine seaplane project, 1927
 MM-2 - minelaying twin-engine biplane seaplane project
 MM-3 (later known as MT-1)

Passenger aircraft
 SUVP (also known as PL-1) - airliner, 1925

Sport aircraft
 E-2 (DG-55) - prototype twin-engine sport aircraft, 1935

For Polikarpov
 I-5 fighter (in cooperation with N.N.Polikarpov), 1930
 DI-3, two-seat escort fighter developed from the Polikarpov DI-2, 1931

References

Aircraft manufacturers of the Soviet Union